Rugged Mountain  is the apex of the Haihte Range on Vancouver Island, British Columbia.  From it, several glaciers, Nootka Sound, Woss Lake and the Tlupana Range are in view.

History
The first attempt at an ascent of Rugged Mountain occurs when Captain Hamilton Moffat, officer in charge of the Hudson's Bay Company post at Fort Rupert, near present-day Port Hardy, began a first exploration inland.  On July 5, 1852 he gave up his attempt.  He named the mountain Ben Lomand.  This was the first recorded attempt to climb any of the major peaks of the Vancouver Island Ranges.

The first successful ascent of Rugged Mountain was completed in 1959 by George Lepore and Chuck Smitson.

References

Sources

External links
 "Vancouver Island Ranges".Canadian Mountain Encyclopedia. Bivouac.com

Vancouver Island Ranges
One-thousanders of British Columbia
Rupert Land District